Stark Bunker Sands (born September 30, 1978) is an American actor. He is known for his role as Tunny in the original Broadway cast of American Idiot, and originating the role of Charlie Price in Kinky Boots on Broadway. He is a two-time Tony Award nominee. He is also known for the roles of Lance Sussman in Die, Mommie, Die! and Lt. Nathaniel Fick in Generation Kill. He starred as Dash Parker in FOX's series Minority Report.

Early life and education
Sands was born in Dallas, Texas. Stark is his mother's maiden name, and Bunker was his late father's middle name, as well as his maternal great-grandmother's maiden name. He has a fraternal twin brother, Jacob, and an older sister. Sands attended Highland Park High School, and went on to gain his BFA in acting from the University of Southern California (class of 2001).

Career
In 2002, Sands played Toby, a recurring love interest to the angst-ridden teen, Claire Fisher (played by Lauren Ambrose), on the HBO television series Six Feet Under (2001–2005) and co-starred in Me and Daphne (2002), a short film directed by Rebecca Gayheart and produced by Brett Ratner.  He has also co-starred in the independent film Pack of Dogs (2002), directed by Ian Kessner.

Sands made his feature-film debut opposite Natasha Lyonne and Jason Priestley in Die, Mommie, Die! (2003), an adaptation of Charles Busch's play of the same name.  He also appeared in the film Shall We Dance (2004), with Richard Gere and Jennifer Lopez.

In 2007, he received a nomination for a Tony Award for Best Featured Actor in a Play for his role in the Broadway revival of Journey's End.

From May 2 to June 8, 2008, he performed the role of Alex in A Seagull in the Hamptons at the McCarter Theatre in Princeton, New Jersey.

Sands also participated in the seven-episode HBO miniseries Generation Kill about the 2003 Iraq invasion, airing during the summer of 2008. In the miniseries he played Marine Lt. Nathaniel Fick. Sands had previously played a U.S. Marine, Walter Gust, in Flags of Our Fathers.

Additional theater credits include the 2009 musical adaptation of Bonnie & Clyde at the La Jolla Playhouse, The Classic Stage Company's production of The Tempest which earned him the Actors' Equity Foundation's St. Clair Bayfield Award, which honors the best performance by an actor in a Shakespearean play in the New York metropolitan area. From June 25 to July 12, 2009, Sands appeared in the Shakespeare in the Park's production of Twelfth Night, featuring Anne Hathaway, Audra McDonald and Raul Esparza.

Sands played the role of Tunny in the Broadway production of American Idiot, again playing a member of the military. He left the production on March 13, 2011; David Larsen took over the role.

Sands was in the 2010 HBO pilot The Miraculous Year, which was not picked up by HBO. He was part of the main cast of the CBS television series Rookies. The show was picked up for mid-season, under the new name NYC 22, but was canceled after airing 13 episodes due to inadequate ratings.

Sands played the character of Troy Nelson in the film Inside Llewyn Davis (2013).

Sands played one of the lead characters, Charlie Price, in the musical Kinky Boots which opened at the Bank of America Theatre in Chicago, Illinois, for a four-week run in October 2012. He reprised his role when the show premiered on Broadway at the Al Hirschfeld Theatre on April 4, 2013, with previews beginning on March 3, 2013. For his role as Charlie, Sands was nominated for a Tony Award for Best Actor in a Musical, but lost to his co-star Billy Porter. He played his final performance on January 26, 2014.

In 2014, Sands was cast in the NBC pilot Salvation. This was not picked up to series. Sands was cast in FOX's pilot, Minority Report, as Dash, a precog. The series premiered on September 21, 2015.

In 2016, Sands played the Templar in Classic Stage Company's production of Nathan the Wise off-Broadway.

Sands and his original co-star Porter returned to the Broadway production of Kinky Boots for a limited 15 week run, starting on September 26, 2017. He also appeared in Steven Spielberg's 2017 drama film The Post.

In 2022, Sands was cast in the North American tryout of & Juliet as William Shakespeare, transferring from the West End. The production opened in Toronto, Canada in the Princess of Wales Theatre on June 22, 2022 and ended on August 14, 2022. & Juliet is scheduled to move to Broadway in the 2022-23 season into the Stephen Sondheim Theatre with Sands reprising his role. Previews are slated to begin on October 28, 2022 with an opening date of November 17, 2022.

Personal life
On July 9, 2011, Sands married British journalist Gemma Clarke at Bovey Castle, England. They met while Sands was vacationing in London. They have a son born in 2015.

Filmography

Theatre

Awards

See also

 List of Broadway musicals stars
 List of people from Dallas
 List of people from New York City

References

External links

 
 
 

1978 births
21st-century American male actors
American male film actors
American male musical theatre actors
American male Shakespearean actors
American male stage actors
American male television actors
Grammy Award winners
Living people
Male actors from Dallas
Male actors from New York City
Musicians from Dallas
Singers from New York City
American twins
Theatre World Award winners
USC School of Dramatic Arts alumni